Happy? is the third album by Canadian singer-songwriter Jann Arden, released on September 23, 1997 (see 1997 in music) in Canada and June 8, 1998 in the United States.

Track listing
All songs written by Jann Arden, except where noted.

"The Sound Of" – 3:33
"Leave Me Now" – 3:50
"I Know You" – 4:16
"Holy Moses" – 4:54
"Wishing That" – 4:12
"Saved" (Arden, C. J. Vanston) – 4:36
"Ode to a Friend" – 2:56
"Shooting Horses" (Arden, Vanston, Russell Broom) – 4:15
"Weeds" – 3:56
"Hangin' by a Thread" (Arden, Robert Foster) – 5:05
"To Sir With Love" (Don Black, Mark London) (Hidden track on Canadian release) – 3:57

Personnel
Jann Arden – vocals, background vocals, harmony vocals
Kenny Aronoff – percussion, drums
Russell Broom – electric guitar
Lenny Castro – percussion
Jennifer Condos – bass guitar
Debra Dobkin – percussion
Lin Elder – background vocals
Mark Goldenberg – acoustic guitar, piano, electric guitar, 12 string guitar
James "Hutch" Hutchinson – bass
Jim Keltner – percussion, drums
Greg Leisz – acoustic guitar, pedal steel, bass, slide guitar, lap steel guitar
Mike Lent – bass
Dillon O'Brian – background vocals
Bill Reichenbach Jr. – bass trombone
Jeffrey C.J. Vanston – synthesizer, piano, keyboards, Wurlitzer

Production
Producers: Jann Arden, Ed Cherney, Mark Goldenberg
Executive producer: Neil MacGonigill
Associate producer: Shari Sutcliffe
Engineers: Ed Cherney, Mark Goldenberg, Duane Seykora
Assistant engineers: Sebastian Haimerl, Bob Salcedo, Mike Scotella
Mixing: Ed Cherney, Duane Seykora
Mixing assistant: Stuart Brawley
Mastering: Doug Sax
Arranger: Mark Goldenberg
Percussion programming: Jeffrey C.J. Vanston
Art direction: Karen Walker

Charts
Album – Billboard (United States)

Jann Arden albums
1997 albums
A&M Records albums